Telok Ayer Chinese Methodist Church (Abbreviation: TACMC), is located on Telok Ayer Street within the Downtown Core of Singapore's central business district. The church is approximately 450 metres from Telok Ayer MRT station.

Founded in 1889, TACMC is the first Chinese Methodist Church to be established in Singapore. It has stood on Telok Ayer Street for more than a hundred years.

TACMC is presently affiliated to the Chinese Annual Conference of the Methodist Church in Singapore. It was gazetted a national monument by Singapore's Urban Redevelopment Authority on 23 March 1989.

History

Telok Ayer Chinese Methodist Church was gazetted a national monument by Singapore's Urban Redevelopment Authority on 23 March 1989.

The church later underwent restoration works which started in October 1993 and were completed in August 1995 at a cost of S$3 million. Telok Ayer Chinese Methodist Church later built a branch church on Wishart Road, off Telok Blangah Road. Its new building, with an 800-seat auditorium, was completed in 2004 and it is presently known as Telok Ayer Chinese Methodist Church (TA2 Sanctuary). The church's Chinese and Hokkien services have been conducted at this church since 2005, while English and afternoon Hokkien services are conducted at the main church building on Telok Ayer Street (TA).

The membership of the church now numbers over a thousand, comprising the congregations attending services in Hokkien, Mandarin and English. The church's music programme, which started in 1935, boasts six all-volunteer choirs — three adult, one youth, and two children's choirs. TACMC's Honorary Music Director is Dr. Emilia Wong; the church's senior pastor is Rev. Chua Ooi Suah.

Architecture

References

News articles

Further reading
.
.

Video
直落亚逸礼拜堂的起源和发展 • The Beginning & Development of Telok Ayer Chinese Methodist Church www.YouTube.com
直落亚逸堂 • 上帝与我们的故事 TELOK AYER CMC • OUR STORY WITH GOD www.YouTube.com

External links

Official website of the Methodist Church in Singapore
Official website of Telok Ayer Chinese Methodist Church
Official website of the Chinese Annual Conference
 Infopedia

20th-century Methodist church buildings
Bukit Merah
Downtown Core (Singapore)
Methodist churches in Singapore
Churches in Singapore
National monuments of Singapore
Churches completed in 1924
20th-century architecture in Singapore